Yu 2 was an Imperial Japanese Army transport submarine of the Yu 1 subclass of the Yu I type. Constructed for use during World War II, she participated in the Philippines campaign of 1944–1945 and was sunk in 1944 while attempting to supply Japanese forces in the Battle of Leyte.

Construction
In the final two years of World War II, the Imperial Japanese Army constructed transport submarines — officially the Type 3 submergence transport vehicle and known to the Japanese Army as the Maru Yu — with which to supply its isolated island garrisons in the Pacific. Only submarines of the Yu I type were completed and saw service. The Yu I type was produced in four subclasses, each produced by a different manufacturer and differing primarily in the design of their conning towers and details of their gun armament. None carried torpedoes or had torpedo tubes. Yu 2 was of the Yu 1 subclass.

Yu 2 was laid down in 1943 by the Hitachi Kasado Works (Hitachi Kasado Seisakujo) at Kudamatsu, Japan. She was launched later in 1943.

Service history
After her delivery to the Japanese Army, Yu 2 initially remained in Japanese home waters while the Army constructed additional submarines of her class and established a training program for their crews. The detachment got underway from Japan on either 28 or 30 May 1944 (according to different sources) bound for Manila on Luzon in the Philippines. The vessels had a difficult voyage which included a number of mechanical breakdowns, but finally arrived at Manila on 18 July 1944. After their arrival, the three submarines underwent repairs and thorough overhauls.

On 20 October 1944, United States Army forces landed on Leyte, beginning both the Battle of Leyte and the broader Philippines campaign of 1944–1945. In November 1944, all three submarines departed on their first supply run to Leyte, bound for Ormoc on Leyte's west coast. Stopping at Bansaan, Yu 2 got back underway on 26 November 1944 for the last leg of her voyage to Ormoc. After she transmitted a message from a position south of Ormoc on 27 November 1944, the Japanese never heard from her again.

After conducting an hour-long shore bombardment, they headed into the Camotes Sea to hunt Japanese shipping. Just after midnight on 28 November, a U.S. Navy PBY Catalina flying boat reported sighting a Japanese submarine on the surface near Pacijan Island heading toward Ormoc Bay, and the destroyers reversed course and steered to intercept the submarine. At 01:27 Waller picked up a surface contact on radar at a range of  just off Pilar Point. Waller illuminated the area with star shells and identified the contact as a surfaced submarine, and all four destroyers opened fire on it. At 01:45, the submarine sank by the stern, leaving six survivors in the water which the destroyers did not attempt to pick up because of their apparent hostile intent toward would-be rescuers. The submarine the destroyers sank probably was Yu 2.

It is unlikely the U.S. destroyers encountered I-46 on 28 November, and far more likely that they sank Yu 2.

References

Footnotes

Bibliography
 

 
Rekishi Gunzō, History of Pacific War Extra, Perfect guide, The submarines of the Imperial Japanese Forces, Gakken, Tokyo Japan, 2005, .
Rekishi Gunzō, History of Pacific War Vol.45, Truth histories of the Imperial Japanese Naval Vessels, Gakken, Tokyo Japan, 2004, .
Ships of the World No.506, Kaijinsha, Tokyo Japan, 1996.
The Maru Special, Japanese Naval Vessels No.43 Japanese Submarines III, Ushio Shobō, Tokyo Japan, 1980.
Atsumi Nakashima, Army Submarine Fleet, "The secret project !, The men challenged the deep sea", Shinjinbutsu Ōraisha, Tokyo Japan, 2006, .
50 year history of the Japan Steel Works (first volume and second volume), Japan Steel Works, 1968.

1943 ships
Ships built in Japan
Submarines of the Imperial Japanese Army
World War II submarines of Japan
Maritime incidents in November 1944
Submarines sunk by United States warships
Japanese submarines lost during World War II
Shipwrecks of the Philippines
World War II shipwrecks in the South China Sea